Salka or Selka may refer to:

Religion
 Salka, Islamic recitation of Quran in Sufism

People
John Salka, American politician
Rod Salka, American boxer
Salka Sól Eyfeld, Icelandic singer
Salka Viertel, Austrian actress

Places
Salka, Slovakian village
Sälka, Swedish mountain range
Salka Aerodrome, Russian aerodrome
Salka and Berthold Viertel House, American home
Šalka Vas, Slovenian settlement